Drouillard may refer to:

People
Clarence Drouillard (1914–1986), Canadian hockey player.
DW (Dave) Drouillard (born 1950), American singer.
George Drouillard (1773-1810), American explorer.

Location
Drouillard House, historic house in Cumberland Furnace, Tennessee